The Library of Entertaining Knowledge was founded by the Society for the Diffusion of Useful Knowledge. The books appeared from 1829 to 1838, published in London by Charles Knight, and complemented the Society's Library of Useful Knowledge, which had not sold as well as hoped. The volumes were priced at 4s. 6d, more expensive than rival non-fiction series.

Notes

Series of books
1820s books
1830s books